Stefano Beltrame is an Italian ambassador and author. Since October 1, 2021, he is the Italian ambassador to Austria.

Biography 
After obtaining a degree in political sciences from University of Padua in 1985 he began his diplomatic career in 1991 at the Italian Ministry of Foreign Affairs and was assigned to the Directorate-General for Economic Affairs.

He served as diplomat in Kuwait (1993–1997), in Germany (Bonn–Berlin, 1998–2001), in Iran (2003–2006), as deputy head of mission, and in United States as First Counselor for Economic, Scientific and Commercial Matters (2006–2010).

Upon his return to Italy in 2010, he was appointed diplomatic advisor to the president of the Veneto Region, Luca Zaia in Venice and head of the Veneto regional office in Brussels.

Subsequently he was the consul general of Italy in Shanghai (2014–2018). He returned to Rome in 2018 as Diplomatic Advisor of the Minister of the Interior. From 2019 to 2021 he was the training manager of the Italian Ministry of Foreign Affairs and International Cooperation.

From October 1, 2021, he is Ambassador of Italy to Austria.

He has published several historical and international political essays.

Honours 
 Officer of the Order of Merit of the Italian Republic – December 27, 2009.

 Knight of the Order of Merit of the Italian Republic – December 27, 2002.

Publications

See also 
 Ministry of Foreign Affairs (Italy)
 Foreign relations of Italy
 List of ambassadors of Italy

References

External links 
 Italian Ministry of Foreign Affairs
 Embassy of Italy to Austria

Italian diplomats
20th-century diplomats
21st-century diplomats
1960 births
Living people
People from Verona
Ambassadors of Italy to Austria